Chris and the Wonderful Lamp is an operetta in four acts by John Philip Sousa with a libretto by Glen MacDonough (best remembered as the librettist for Victor Herbert's Babes in Toyland). Of the nine operettas that Sousa wrote between 1885 and 1909, Chris and the Wonderful Lamp is number 7, chronologically. It was composed in 1899 and was based on a popular book of the same name by Albert Stearns, and retells the story of a young man from Connecticut who buys Aladdin's lamp at an auction and employs the genie to help him see his love, Fanny, who is sequestered in a school for girls. (Stearns later wrote the script for a 1917 film of the same name, based on his story.) Sousa's Chris... is the only one of his operettas specifically written to appeal to children, was immediately popular, and has remained in the repertoire even today, undergoing periodic revivals.

Chris and the Wonderful Lamp was first produced at the Hyperion Theatre in New Haven, beginning on October 23, 1899.  After this tryout, it moved to Oscar Hammerstein's Victoria Theater  in New York, opening on January 1, 1900. where it ran for 58 performances. The cast  featured Jerome Sykes and Edna Wallace Hopper. Reviews of the opening were extraordinarily favorable. The World (New York) (January 2, 1900) said: “Chris and the Wonderful Lamp did miracles at Hammersteins Victoria last night...[it] will be a huge success. Everything in it is good...Sousa did not spare his muse in its composition, nor Hammerstein his money in its production.”

References
The World (New York), January 2, 1900.

External links
 

English-language operettas
1899 operas
Compositions by John Philip Sousa
Operas